SpaceX Crew-2 was the second operational flight of a Crew Dragon spacecraft, and the third overall crewed orbital flight of the Commercial Crew Program. The mission was launched on 23 April 2021 at 09:49:02 UTC, and docked to the International Space Station on 24 April at 09:08 UTC.

SpaceX Crew-2 used the same capsule as Crew Dragon Demo-2 (Endeavour) and launched on the same Falcon 9 booster as SpaceX Crew-1 (B1061.1).

With its return to Earth the evening of 9 November 2021, the mission set a record for the longest spaceflight by a U.S. crewed spacecraft, 199 days.

Crew 
On 28 July 2020, JAXA, ESA and NASA confirmed their astronaut assignments aboard this mission.

German astronaut Matthias Maurer was the backup for Pesquet, while Japanese astronaut Satoshi Furukawa trained as backup to Hoshide.

Mission 

The second SpaceX operational mission in the Commercial Crew Program launched on 23 April 2021. The Crew Dragon Endeavour (C206), docked to the International Docking Adapter (IDA) on the Harmony module at its forward port. This mission was the first with astronauts on board with a previously used booster launch vehicle.

All crew members were veteran astronauts, though this was Megan McArthur's first visit to the ISS (as her first spaceflight was STS-125, a mission to the Hubble Space Telescope). McArthur used the same seat on the SpaceX Crew Dragon Endeavour in this mission which her husband, Bob Behnken, used on the Demo-2 mission. Akihiko Hoshide served as the second Japanese ISS commander during his stay. It was the second mission by Thomas Pesquet to the International Space Station and was named  Alpha, after Alpha Centauri, the closest star system to Earth.

As preparation for the launch of Starliner, the Crew Dragon Endeavour docked to ISS at Harmony forward port for its Crew-2 mission was undocked at 10:45 UTC and relocated to Harmony zenith port on 21 July 2021, at 11:36 UTC.

With CRS-23, (C208) and Inspiration4 (Resilience), three Dragon spacecraft were in space at the same time, from 16 to 18 September 2021 (UTC).

Timeline

Wake-up calls 
NASA began a tradition of playing music to astronauts during the Gemini program, and first used music to wake up a flight crew during Apollo 15. Each track is specially chosen, often by the astronauts' families, and usually has a special meaning to an individual member of the crew, or is applicable to their daily activities.

Return 
Due to weather delays and a minor health problem with one of the SpaceX Crew-3 crew, NASA decided to bring home the Crew-2 astronauts from the ISS before launching Crew-3, thus being the first Crew Dragon indirect handover of space station crews. The Crew Dragon undocked from the station at 19:05 UTC on 8 November 2021 and splashed down off the coast of Florida at 03:33 UTC on 9 November 2021. One of four parachutes deployed slower than the others.

See also 
 Crew Dragon Endeavour
 Boeing Starliner

Notes

References 

SpaceX Dragon 2
Spacecraft launched in 2021
SpaceX payloads contracted by NASA
SpaceX human spaceflights
2021 in the United States
Fully civilian crewed orbital spaceflights
Spacecraft which reentered in 2021